ClearTrial is a multinational software developer headquartered in Chicago, Illinois, USA. The company develops and markets a software as a service (SaaS) system designed for biopharmaceutical and medical device manufacturers for the planning, outsourcing, and tracking of clinical trials.

The ClearTrial software architecture follows a project management methodology that includes activity-based costing, which predicts the level of effort for a specific resource (person) to perform a given task (activity). The level of effort is calculated based on an algorithm that has been derived from analysis of the cost and time drivers that affect each task. The ClearTrial Work Breakdown Structure defines and groups the tasks and subtasks that comprise a clinical trial in a way that organizes and defines the total work scope of the clinical project.

ClearTrial’s clinical trial subject matter experts (SMEs) have published peer-reviewed articles on functional service provider outsourcing in clinical trials, adaptive clinical trials, and clinical trials for medical devices, as well as articles on clinical trial trends. In April 2011, ClearTrial was named one of five “Cool Vendors in Life Sciences” by the research firm Gartner.

On March 29, 2012, Oracle Corporation announced that it had agreed to acquire ClearTrial.  The transaction has closed.

References

External links
 ClearTrial on Oracle website

Clinical trials
Pharmaceutical industry
Clinical data management
Software companies based in Illinois
Cloud applications
Defunct software companies of the United States